Joe Z. Tsien is a neuroscientist who pioneered Cre/lox-neurogenetics in the mid-1990s, a versatile toolbox for neuroscientists to study the complex relationships between genes, neural circuits, and behaviors. He is also known as the creator of the smart mouse Doogie in the late 1990s while being a faculty member at Princeton University. Recently, he developed the Theory of Connectivity in an effort to explain the origin of intelligence, or the basic design principle underlying brain computation and intelligence. The theory states that brain computation is organized by a power-of-two-based permutation logic in constructing cell assemblies - the basic building blocks of neural circuits. The theory has received initial validation from experiments. The discovery of this basic computational logic of the brain can have important implications for the development of artificial general intelligence.

Education 
Tsien earned his A.B. in Biology/Physiology from East China Normal University in Shanghai (1984). Tsien obtained his Ph.D. in Molecular Biology from the University of Minnesota in 1990.

Career 
In the early and mid-1990s, Tsien worked with two Nobel laureates, Eric Kandel and Susumu Tonegawa. In 1997, Tsien became a faculty member in the Department of Molecular Biology at Princeton University, where he genetically engineered and created Doogie, a smart mouse. In 2007, Tsien launched the Brain Decoding Project under which he has led a team of neuroscientists, computer scientists and mathematicians to record and decipher systematically the neural codes in the mouse brain, with funding supported in part by Georgia Research Alliance.Tsien's Brain Decoding Project has provided a valuable test case and inspiration for other neuroscientists in Europe and the United States to initiate large-scale projects such as the BRAIN Initiative and Human BRAIN Projects in 2013.

Tsien is currently working in China and continues to serve as the director of the International Brain Decoding Project Consortium.

Research
Tsien pioneered Cre-loxP-mediated brain subregion- and cell type-specific genetic techniques in 1996, enabling researchers to manipulate or introduce any gene in a specific brain region or a given type of neuron. This transformative technique has led to NIH Blueprint for Neuroscience Research in launching several Cre-driver Mouse Resource projects. Over the past 20 years, Cre-lox recombination-mediated neurogenetics has emerged as one of the most powerful and versatile technology platforms for cell-specific gene knockouts, transgenic overexpression, neural circuit tracing, Brainbow, optogenetics, CLARITY, voltage imaging and chemical genetics.

Tsien is also widely known as the creator of the smart mouse Doogie. While as a faculty at Princeton University, Tsien has speculated that one of the NMDA receptor's subunits may hold the key for superior learning and memory at young ages. Accordingly, his laboratory genetically engineered a transgenic mouse in which they over-expressed the NR2B subunit of the NMDA receptor in the mouse cortex and hippocampus. In 1999, his team reported that the transgenic mouse, nicknamed Doogie, indeed showed to have enhanced synaptic plasticity and enhanced learning and retention, as well as greater flexibility in learning new patterns. The discovery of the NR2B as a key genetic factor for memory enhancement prompted other researchers to discover over two dozen other genes for memory enhancement, many of which regulate the NR2B pathway. One of the NR2B-based memory-enhancement strategies, via dietary supplements of a brain-penetrating magnesium ion, magnesium L-threonate, is currently undergoing clinical trials for memory improvement.

Tsien has also made several other major discoveries, including the unified cell-assembly mechanism for explaining how episodic memory and semantic memory are generated in the memory circuits. His laboratory also discovered the nest cells in the mouse brain, revealing how animals recognize the abstract concept of nest or home.

Tsien is also the first to show that defective Alzheimer's genes (e.g. presenilin-1) impaired adult neurogenesis in the dentate gyrus of the hippocampus, revealing the role of adult neurogenesis in memory clearance.

In addition, Tsien has developed a method capable of selectively erasing a memory of choice, such as a particular fear memory, in the mouse brain.

Tsien also demonstrated that the NMDA receptor in the dopamine circuit plays a crucial role in the formation of habit.

Tsien is currently leading a team of neuroscientists, computer scientists and mathematicians, who are working on the Brain Decoding Project, a large-scale brain activity mapping effort, which he and his colleagues have initiated since 2007 with the support from the Georgia Research Alliance (GRA).

In 2015, Tsien developed the Theory of Connectivity to explain the design principle upon which evolution and development may construct the brain to be capable of generating intelligence. This theory has made six predictions which have received supportive evidence by a recent set of experiments on both the mouse brain and hamster brain. At its core, the Theory of Connectivity predicts that the cell assemblies in the brain are not random, rather they should conform to the power-of-two-based equation, N = 2i - 1, to form the pre-configured building block termed as the functional connectivity motif (FCM). Instead of using a single neuron as the computational unit in some extremely simple brains, the theory denotes that in most brains, a group of neurons exhibiting similar tuning properties, termed as a neural clique, should serve as the basic computing processing unit (CPU). Defined by the power-of-two-based equation, N = 2i - 1, each FCM consists of principal-projection neuron cliques (N), ranging from those specific cliques receiving specific information inputs (i) to those general and sub-general cliques receiving various combinatorial convergent inputs. As the evolutionarily conserved logic, its validation requires experimental demonstrations of the following three major properties: 1) Anatomical prevalence - FCMs are prevalent across neural circuits, regardless of gross anatomical shapes; 2) Species conservancy - FCMs are conserved across different animal species; and 3) Cognitive universality - FCMs serve as a universal computational logic at the cell-assembly level for processing a variety of cognitive experiences and flexible behaviors. More importantly, this Theory of Connectivity further predicts that the specific-to-general combinatorial connectivity pattern within FCMs should be pre-configured by evolution, and emerge innately from development as the brain's computational primitives. This proposed design principle can also explain the general purpose and computational algorithm of the neocortex. This proposed design principle of intelligence can be examined via various experiments and also be modeled by neuromorphic engineers and computer scientists. The same power-of-two-based permutation logic has recently been described for lexical retrieval processes in humans, which shows parallels to the computing base of the quantum computer. However, Dr. Joe Tsien cautions that artificial general intelligence based on the brain's principles can come with great benefits and, potentially, even greater risks.

Recognition
Tsien has received awards for his research contributions, including:
 2012 Distinguished Scientist Award from the International Behavioral and Neural Genetics Society
 Keck Distinguished Young Scholar Award
 Burroughs Wellcome Young Investigator Award
 Scientific Achievement Award from the Association of Chinese Americans
 Beckman Young Investigator Award

Popular science
Tsien has contributed articles to Scientific American in the areas of neuroscience of memory enhancement and memory decoding. He has written chapters on learning and memory for several popular textbooks.

Historiography
According to the Song dynasty book, Tongzhi, the Qian surname (Tsien) descends from one of the legendary Five Emperors (Zhuanxu, mythological emperor of ancient China, Shang dynasty, Chinese: 商朝). Emperor Zhuanxu (Chinese: trad. 顓頊, simp. 颛顼, pinyin Zhuānxū), also known as Gaoyang (t 高陽, s 高阳, p Gāoyáng) who was the grandson of the first Chinese Emperor known as Yellow Emperor, ruled the Yellow River valley, the origin of China, in the second millennium BC from 2514 BC – 2436 BC (Early Bronze Age). During the Five Dynasties and Ten Kingdoms period (907-960), King Qian Liu and his descendants ruled the independent kingdom of Wuyue in south-eastern China. Joe Tsien was born in 1962 in Wuxi and is the 42nd generation of Qian Liu descendants.

References

External links
 Georgia Research Alliance
 Augusta University

Year of birth missing (living people)
Living people
American neuroscientists
East China Normal University alumni
University of Minnesota College of Biological Sciences alumni
Georgia Regents University faculty